Sveti Florjan may refer to several settlements in Slovenia: 

 Florjan pri Gornjem Gradu, known as Sveti Florjan until 1953
 Florjan, Šoštanj, known as Sveti Florjan until 1955
 Sveti Florjan nad Škofjo Loko, known as Sveti Florjan until 1955